is a Japanese voice actor affiliated with Aoni Production.

He is most known for the roles of Buta Gorilla (Kiteretsu Daihyakka), Daima Jin (High School! Kimengumi), Oolong (Dragon Ball), Dr. Escargon (Kirby: Right Back at Ya!), Ashibe's Father (Shōnen Ashibe), and Scoop-kun (Shūkan Kodomo News) also Capone "Gang" Bege (One Piece).

His wife is Japanese actress Sanae Takagi.

Filmography

Television animation
 Mobile Suit Gundam (1979) (Marker Clan, Job John)
 Choriki Robo Galatt (1984) (Kiwi Grekovich)
 Dragon Ball (1986) (Oolong, Ko-Gamera, Boxer, Wolf, Seal Soldier)
 Maison Ikkoku (1986) (Kindergarten Principal)
 Transformers: The Headmasters (1987) (Mindwipe(Japanese:Wipe))
 Dragon Ball Z (1989) (Oolong, Karin, Yamu, Bubbles, Haiya Dragon, Tsuno, Mayor)
 21 Emon (1991) (Gonsuke)
 Dragon League (1993) (Amon)
 Dragon Ball GT (1996) (Big Bro' Kidnapper)
 GeGeGe no Kitarō #4 (1996) (Ittan Momen, Nurikabe)
 Cowboy Bebop (1998) (Dr. Yuuri Kellerman)
 Kirby: Right Back at Ya! (2001) (Dr. Escargon)
 Magical☆Shopping Arcade Abenobashi (2002) (Shin Imamiya, Aban narration)
 Mobile Suit Gundam SEED (2002) (Lewis Halberton)
 Astro Boy (2003) (Robita)
 Gin Tama (2006) (Yagyu Binbokusai)
 GeGeGe no Kitarō #5 (2007) (Konaki-Jijii, Nurikabe)
 Dragon Ball Kai (2009) (Oolong)
 Hunter × Hunter (2011) (Zenji)
 Dragon Ball Super (2015) (Oolong, Magetta, Kaiō-sama and Narrator (indefinitely took over the later two on September 27, 2015 while Jōji Yanami takes medical leave)
 GeGeGe no Kitarō #6 (2018) (Abura-sumashi (ep 5), Miminaga (ep 27), Demon Buer (33), Oshiroibaba (44),)
 Heaven's Design Team (2021) (God, the Creator)
 Kubo Won't Let Me Be Invisible (2023) (Unsen-sensei)

Unknown date 
 Angel Heart (Hideo Mochiyama)
 Anime Sanjushi (Coby)
 Aura Battler Dunbine (Hon Wan, multiple minor characters)
 B Biidaman Bakugaiden V (Count Dracula)
 Blue Gale Xabungle (Propopiev Sandora)
 Bomberman Jetters (Dr. Mechado)
 Cyborg Kuro-chan (narrator)
 Chikkun Takkun (Jitabata Mechaman)
 Demashita! Powerpuff Girls Z (Poncho)
 Doraemon (Sunetsugu, Suneo (took over after Kaneta Kimotsuki left, from November 15, 1985 to December 6, 1985))
 Dragon League (Amon)
 Dragon Quest (Zanack)
 Dragon Quest: Dai no Daibōken (Zaboera)
 Duel Masters (Maruo Kakuko)
 Fearsome Biomen Umekichi
 Future GPX Cyber Formula (Edelhi Bootsvorz)
 Hajime no Ippo (Yanaoka)
 Hare Tokidoki Buta (Principal)
 High School! Kimengumi (Daima Jin)
 Kyatto Ninden Teyandee (Gennarisai)
 Kaito Joker (Dokusaburou Oniyama)
 Kimagure Orange Road (Kazuya Hatta)
 Kingyo Chūihō (Same)
 Kinnikuman: Nisei (Nakano-san, Minch)
 Kiteretsu Daihyakka (Kaoru Kumada (Buta Gorilla) (2nd appearance))
 Maho Girls PreCure! (Labut)
 Mahō no Star Magical Emi (Topo)
 Maitchingu Machiko-sensei (Kinzō Abashiri)
 Mashurambō (Kūtaru)
 Meimon! Daisan Yakyūbu (Hiroshi Takahashi)
 Metal Fighter MIKU (Kōzō Shibano)
 Mobile Fighter G Gundam (Romalio Monini)
 Mobile Suit Gundam SEED Destiny (Lewis Halberton)
 Mobile Suit Gundam ZZ (Danny, Dudemo)
 Mushrambo (Kutal)
 Nine: Final (Okabe)
 Obake no Q-tarō (Kisa)
 One Piece (Tonjit, Capone Bege, Vasco Shot)
 Pokémon (Professor Nishinomori)
 Red Baron (Isao Kumano)
 Sailor Moon Supers (Mister Magic Pierrot,Old Dentist)
 Saint Seiya (Jamian)
 Shin Hakkenden (Chūji)
 Shōnen Ashibe (Ashibe's dad)
 Sorcerer Hunters (Sukoya)
 Sue Cat (Billy)
 Susie-chan to Marvie (Professor Peabunny)
 Tanoshii Willow Town (Tad)
 Tsuribaka Nisshi (Kazuo Sasaki)
 Urusei Yatsura (???)
 Wowser (Wowser)
 Yu-Gi-Oh! Duel Monsters GX (Vice-Principal Napoleon)
 Zipang (Kanji Ishiwara)

Original video animation (OVA)
Dream Hunter Rem (xxxx) (Beta)
Future GPX Cyber Formula (xxxx) (Edelhi Bootsvorz)
Grappler Baki (xxxx) (Mitsunari Tokugawa)
Kimagure Orange Road (xxxx) (Kazuya Hatta)
Luna Varga (xxxx) (Chef)
Roger Rabbit's Car Toon Spin (xxxx) (Smart Ass)
Space Pirate Captain Herlock: The Endless Odyssey (xxxx) (Yattran)
Saint Seiya  (xxxx) (Skelleton Marchino)
Legend of the Galactic Heroes (1991) (Pretzer)

Films
 Doraemon: The Records of Nobita, Spaceblazer (1981) (Middle School Student)
 Nine (1983) (Sata)
 Highschool! Kimen-gumi (1986) (Daima Jin)
 Dragon Ball (1986-1996)
 Curse of the Blood Rubies (Oolong)
 Sleeping Princess in Devil's Castle (Oolong)
 Mystical Adventure (Oolong)
 Dragon Ball: The Path to Power
 Dragon Ball Z (1990-2015)
 The World's Strongest (Oolong)
 The Tree of Might (Oolong, Haiya Dragon, Bubbles)
 Lord Slug (Oolong, Haiya Dragon, Bubbles)
 Cooler's Revenge (Oolong, Haiya Dragon)
 The Return of Cooler (Oolong)
 Super Android 13 (Oolong)
 Broly: The Legendary Super Saiyan (Oolong, Bubbles)
 Bojack Unbound (Oolong, Bujin, Bubbles)
 Bio-Broly (Jaga Bada, Bubbles)
 Wrath of the Dragon (Oolong)
 Battle of Gods (Oolong)
 Resurrection 'F' (Oolong)
 My Neighbor Totoro (1988) (Catbus)
 Kimagure Orange Road: The Movie (1988) (Kazuya Hatta)
 Doraemon: Nobita and the Animal Planet (1990) (Crow)
 Dorami-chan: The Blue Straw Hat (1994) (Ponpu)
 Shin Kimagure Orange Road: Summer Beginning (1996) (Kazuya Hatta)
 Kinnikuman: Nisei (2001) (Kazuo Nakano)
 Dobutsu no Mori (film), the film adaptation of the Animal Crossing video game series. (2006) (Tanukichi/Tom Nook)
 Tamagotchi: The Movie (2007) (Mr. Turtle Dictionary)
 Doraemon: Nobita and the New Steel Troops—Winged Angels (2011) (Vice Commander) 
 Doraemon: Nobita and the Island of Miracles—Animal Adventure (2012) (Gonsuke)
 Doraemon: Nobita's Secret Gadget Museum (2013) (Gonsuke)

Video games
 Ace Combat 5 (xxxx) (Transport Pilot, Yuktobania Navy Commandant)
 Battle Fantasia (xxxx) (Donvalve Du Don)
 BS Super Mario Collection (xxxx) (Bowser)
 BS Super Mario USA Power Challenge (xxxx) (Commander, FryGuy, Clawglip)
 Corpse Seed (2007) (Sid Le Creuset)
 Dragon Ball Z: Budokai (2003) (Oolong, Karin)
 Dragon Ball Z: Budokai 3 (2005) (Oolong, Karin)
 Final Fantasy VII Remake (2020) (Palmer)
 Kingdom Hearts II (2005) (Rabbit)
 Kinnikuman Nisei: Legend Choujins vs. New Generation Choujins (xxxx) (Nakano-san)
 Kinnikuman Generations (xxxx) (Nakano-san)
 Kinnikuman Muscle Generations (xxxx) (Nakano-san)
 Kinnikuman Muscle Grand Prix Max (xxxx) (Nakano-san)
 Klonoa 2: Lunatea's Veil (2001) (Baguji)
 Makeruna! Makendō 2 (xxxx) (Makkey)
 Metal Gear Solid 3: Snake Eater (2004) (Sokolov)
 Policenauts (1996) (Jun Ishida)
  (xxxx) (Mr. R, The Devil)
 Shining Force EXA (2007) (Garyu)
 Sonic the Hedgehog (series) (xxxx) (Bean the Dynamite)
 Spyro The Dragon (xxxx) (Dragon Voice)
 Tales of Phantasia: Narikiri Dungeon X (xxxx) (Albert)
 Tales of the World: Radiant Mythology (xxxx) (Ganser)
 Tengai Makyou III-Namida (xxxx) (Ichimonshi)
 Xenoblade Chronicles 2 (2017) (Cole)

Japanese voice-over
 Junior High Science (xxxx) (中学生理科 Chūgakusei Rika, on NHK) (narrator)

Tokusatsu
 Gekisou Sentai Carranger (1996) (DD Donmo (ep. 26))
 Hyakujuu Sentai Gaoranger (2002) (New Year's Org (ep. 46))
 Tokusou Sentai Dekaranger (2004) (Poppenian Haimaru (ep. 36))
 Mahou Sentai Magiranger (2005) (Hades Beastman Gaston the Thief (ep. 25))
 GoGo Sentai Boukenger (2006) (Tsukumogami Kawazugami (ep. 9))
 Ultra Galaxy Mega Monster Battle: Never Ending Odyssey (2008-2009) (Alien Guts (ep. 2 and 10))
 Kaizoku Sentai Gokaiger (2011) (Zakyura (ep. 33))
 Ressha Sentai ToQger (2014) (Tombstone Shadow (ep. 39))
 Tetsuwan Tantei Robotack (xxxx) (Might Burn, Mighty Wonder)
 X-Bomber (xxxx) (Bigman Lee)

CD drama
 Itazura na Kiss (xxxx) (Irie Papa)
 Madara Tenshō-hen (xxxx) (Jato)

Dubbing roles

Live-action
 Christopher Robin (Rabbit)
 Twin Dragons (Tarzan (Teddy Robin))

Animation
 Kung Fu Panda (Mister Ping)
 Shrek Forever After (Pig #1)
 Space Jam: A New Legacy (Porky Pig)
 Thomas the Tank Engine and Friends (Salty the Dockyard Diesel, Sir Handel, Farmer McColl (Season 6 only)) (Season 4-8)
 Winnie the Pooh (Rabbit) (2nd voice)

References

External links
 Naoki Tatsuta at Aoni Production.
 
 Naoki Tatsuta at GamePlaza-Haruka Voice Acting Database 
 Naoki Tatsuta at Hitoshi Doi's Seiyuu Database 

1950 births
Living people
Male voice actors from Wakayama Prefecture
Japanese male video game actors
Japanese male voice actors
Aoni Production voice actors
Tokyo Actor's Consumer's Cooperative Society voice actors
20th-century Japanese male actors
21st-century Japanese male actors